Beverly D. Thomson  (born April 15, 1966) is a Canadian journalist and correspondent with CTV News Channel. Along with Seamus O'Regan, Thomson was co-host of Canada AM, CTV's former national morning show, from 2003 to 2016.  In 2006, she received the Gemini Humanitarian Award.

Early life and education
Thomson was born on April 15 in Toronto, Ontario and attended York University and Seneca College, where she majored in broadcast journalism. After graduating in 1987, she received the school's Distinguished Alumni Award in 2000 and the Ontario Premier's Award for Creative Arts & Design in 2003.

Career
Upon graduating from Seneca College, Thomson worked at a Newmarket radio station and at CFTO Toronto as an anchor on the weekend news program. She then moved to Global affiliate CIII as the anchor of both the 5:30 p.m. and 6:00 p.m from 1997 to 2003 weeknight news broadcasts. It was during this time that Thomson was diagnosed with breast cancer and became the subject of a documentary called There Is No Fear, focusing on her recovery. In July 2003, Thomson was chosen as the replacement for Lisa LaFlamme on CTV's Canada AM, however, was delayed due to a dispute between CTV and Global TV. Her former employer argued that Thomson had three years left on her exclusive contract but was able to settle out of court. As a result of the settlement, Thomson was allowed to make her Canada AM debut on November 3, 2003. Three years after her Canada AM debut, Thompson was the recipient of the 2006 Gemini Humanitarian Award. In 2009, Thomson was appointed by Tom McGrath as the first Canadian National Ambassador for The Duke of Edinburgh’s Award.

While with CTV News, Thomson co-hosted their Olympic Morning program during the 2010 Winter Olympics and reported on the First inauguration of Barack Obama. After Canada AM was canceled in 2016, she continued with the network. In 2019, Thomson was appointed a Member of the Order of Canada for "outstanding contributions to Canada’s broadcasting industry and volunteerism."

She also made a cameo appearance on Corner Gas episode "Gopher It" (Season 4, Episode 19 ) as the co-host of Canada AM where she and Wanda were shown to have clear dislike for each other on live tv.

Personal life
Thomson and her ex-husband Rob Dale have two children together.

Upon her diagnosis with breast cancer, Thomson became an active figure with several Canadian charities. She was appointed the official spokesperson for the Ontario branch of the Canadian Breast Cancer Foundation and received their Voice of the Foundation Award.

References

1966 births
Living people
Canadian Screen Award winners
Canadian television journalists
Journalists from Toronto
Seneca College alumni
Canadian women television journalists
CTV Television Network people
Members of the Order of Canada
20th-century Canadian journalists
21st-century Canadian journalists
20th-century Canadian women